Wonderland is an album by saxophonist/composer Benny Carter recorded in 1976 but not released by the Pablo label until 1986.

Reception

AllMusic reviewer Scott Yanow stated "Although it often has the feeling of a jam session, the fact that, in addition to two standards, there are five obscure Carter compositions makes one realize that more planning than usual went into this date, and it shows". In JazzTimes Stanley Dance wrote "Saxophonist Benny Green’s admiring notes scarcely conceal regret at the changes time wrought on Benny Carter’s fluent style-“a tendency to tongue more notes instead of playing extended legato passages, and a penchant for crotchet-triplets which had a way of breaking up the old suave flow.” What, in other words, was a gain for one part of the audience was a grievous loss for another. Here, nevertheless, are rewards for both. Besides “Misty” and “Three Little Words,” there are five of Carter’s own numbers. He is joined by Sweets Edison and Lockjaw Davis on three of these to good effect".

Track listing
All compositions by Benny Carter except where noted
 "Stroll" – 7:18
 "Johnny" – 4:38
 "Alta Vista" – 5:40
 "Misty" (Erroll Garner, Johnny Burke) – 5:38
 "Wonderland" – 6:40
 "Three Little Words" (Harry Ruby, Bert Kalmar) – 5:14	
 "Editation" – 3:36

Personnel 
Benny Carter – alto saxophone
Harry "Sweets" Edison – trumpet
Eddie "Lockjaw" Davis – tenor saxophone
Ray Bryant – piano
Milt Hinton – bass
Grady Tate – drums

References 

1986 albums
Benny Carter albums
Pablo Records albums
Albums produced by Norman Granz